Paulina Manov (born 20 June 1975) is a Serbian actress. She appeared in more than fifteen films since 1998.

Selected filmography

References

External links 

1975 births
Living people
Actresses from Belgrade
Serbian film actresses